Susan Wiggs (born May 17, 1958) is an American author of historical and contemporary romance novels.

Early years
Wiggs began writing as a child, finishing her first novel, A Book About Some Bad Kids, when she was eight.  She temporarily abandoned her dream of being a novelist after graduating from Harvard University, instead becoming a math teacher.  She continued to read, especially reveling in romance novels.  After running out of reading material one evening in 1983, she began writing again, using the working title A Book About Some Bad Adults.

Career
For three years Wiggs continued to write, and in 1987 Zebra Books published her first novel, a Western historical romance named Texas Wildflower.  Her subsequent historical and contemporary romances have been set in a wide range of settings and time periods.   Many of her novels are set in areas where she's lived or visited.  She gave up teaching in 1992 to write full-time, and has since completed an average of two books per year.

In 2000, Wiggs began writing single-title women's fiction stories in addition to historical romance novels.  The first, The You I Never Knew, was published in 2001. After writing mass-market original novels for several years, Wiggs made her hardcover debut in 2003 with Home Before Dark.

Many of her novels are connected, allowing Wiggs to revisit established characters.

Her books have been published in many languages, including French, German, Dutch, Latvian, Japanese, Hungarian and Russian.

Awards
Wiggs's books are frequently named finalists for the RITA Award, the highest honor given in the genre. She received the Romance Writers of America RITA Award for Best Romance of the year in 1993 for Lord of the Night.  She won a second RITA in 2000 when The Charm School was named "Favorite Book of the Year." She has also won the RITA in 2001 for Best Short Historical for The Mistress.  and in 2006 for Lakeside Cottage. She has also been the recipient of the Holt Medallion, the Colorado Award of Excellence, and the Peninsula Romance Writers of America Blue Boa Award.  Romantic Times has twice named her a Career Achievement Award winner.

Personal
Wiggs lives on Bainbridge Island, Washington.  Her mother maintains her web page.

Bibliography

Stand-alone novels  
Texas Wildflower (1987)
Briar Rose (1987)
Winds of Glory (1988)
Embrace the Day (1988)
Moonshadow (1989)
The Raven and the Rose (1991)
Lord of the Night (1993)
Miranda (1996)
Merry Christmas, Baby! (1996)
The Lightkeeper (1998)
The Drifter (1999)
Husband for Hire (1999)
The You I Never Knew (2001)
Passing Through Paradise (2002)
Home Before Dark (2003)
Summer by the Sea (2004)
Lakeside Cottage (2005)
Table for Five (2005)
Just Breathe (2008)
The Borrowed Bride (2008)
How I Planned Your Wedding (2011)
The Goodbye Quilt (2011) also in The Summer It Begins
The St. James Affair (2014) also in Snowfall in the City
A Fairytale Christmas (2014)
Island Time (2016)
Map of the Heart (2017)
Between You and Me (June 26, 2018)
The Oysterville Sewing Circle (2019)
Sugar and Salt (2022)

Lakeshore Chronicles

Bella Vista Chronicles

Switchback, Vermont

Calhoun Chronicles

Us Series

Great Chicago Fire Trilogy

Tudor Rose series

Women of War series

Discovery series

Picture books
The Canary Who Sailed with Columbus (1989)

Anthologies and collections

References

External links
Official website

20th-century American novelists
21st-century American novelists
American romantic fiction writers
Harvard University alumni
Living people
RITA Award winners
Writers from Bainbridge Island, Washington
American women novelists
Women romantic fiction writers
20th-century American women writers
21st-century American women writers
Novelists from Washington (state)
1958 births
Writers of historical romances